Maathina Malla is a 1998 Indian Kannada-language comedy film written and directed by Yogish Hunsur. The film stars Jaggesh and Charulatha. V. Manohar scored and composed the film's soundtrack while Ramesh Babu handled the cinematography.

Cast 
 Jaggesh
 Charulatha
 Vijayalakshmi
 Swarna
 Vanishree
 Ramakrishna
 Bank Janardhan
 Mandya Ramesh
 Umashree
 Umesh
 M. N. Lakshmi Devi

Soundtrack

References

External links

 Maathina Malla at Gaana

1998 films
1990s Kannada-language films